WNFL (1440 AM) is an American all-sports radio station located in Green Bay, Wisconsin. The station is locally owned and operated by Midwest Communications, which owns six other stations in Northeast Wisconsin. WNFL simulcasts the programming of WRNW in Milwaukee from 6 a.m. to 6 p.m. on weekdays. The station is also an affiliate of Fox Sports Radio, carrying much of their line-up for the remainder of the day and on weekends. It airs one minute news updates from CBS at approximately 45 minutes past the hour. In addition to the station's sports-talk offerings, WNFL airs Milwaukee Bucks basketball play-by-play and local high school football and basketball games. Milwaukee Brewers baseball games during the work week are also on WNFL, with night and weekend games on sister station WTAQ.

Former programming on the station included The Steve Czaban Show and the station's local Maino & Nick (John Maino and Nick Vitrano) show.

WNFL's studios and transmitter are located on Bellevue Street in the Green Bay suburb of Bellevue. Weather updates are provided by the "FOX 11 Severe Weather Lab" at WLUK-TV.

History

The Green Bay Press-Gazette built WJPG – a daytimer – in 1947 and it began broadcasting with 1000 watts of power on 810 kHz on December 12, 1947. Nighttime service was added in the station's early ears, and WJPG changed AM frequencies from 810 to 1440 kHz on May 24, 1951. Daytime power was increased to 5,000 watts on June 16, 1954.

WJPG was a CONELRAD authorized radio station, meaning that if CONELRAD were activated, WJPG would remain on the air and transmit emergency information. A CONELRAD alarm was incorrectly sent to the WJPG control station on the evening of November 5, 1959. The message sent to the control station was "This is an air defense radio alert", rather than what should have been sent for a test, "This is an air defense line check." Northeast Wisconsin's three television stations (WFRV, WLUK, and WBAY) and radio stations WBAY and WJPG were all taken offline for 20 minutes as they prepared to implement CONELRAD alert procedures, until the error was realized and the alert preparation was reversed.

WJPG changed its call letters to WNFL on August 7, 1967, several months after the Green Bay Packers won Super Bowl I. WNFL changed ownership several times until 1996, when Midwest Communications acquired the station, along with sister stations WNCY and WYDR (then WROE).

WNFL personalities
Mark Daniels: "WNFL Sports Report" anchor and high school sports play-by-play
Doug Higgins: Weekend weather (from WLUK-TV)
Pete Petoniak: Morning/early-afternoon weather (from WLUK-TV)
Patrick Powell: Late-afternoon/evening/overnight weather (from WLUK-TV)
Jason Hillery: Program Director

References

External links
FCC History Cards for WNFL

Midwest Communications

NFL
Sports radio stations in the United States
Midwest Communications radio stations